Markušovce Manor House is a village and municipality in the Spišská Nová Ves District in the Košice Region of central-eastern Slovakia.

History
Markušovce was founded in the 12th century before the Tatar invasions of the region. The village was owned by the Mariassy family from the 13th century, and many members of the family are buried in the village's Church of St. Michael.

The castle of Markušovce Manor House dates from 1284. but was not used after a fire in 1773.

The manor house of Markušovce Manor House was built in 1643 and is now a museum, together with the rococo belvedere or garden house 'Dardanely', dating from 1778, which stands in its grounds; this contains a collection of musical instruments and is frequently used for concerts.

Geography
The village lies at an altitude of 435 metres and covers an area of 18.509 km2.

Demography 
In 2011 has a population of 3,896 inhabitants. The population increased to 4,326 in 2021.

References

External links
 www.markusovce.sk
 http://en.e-obce.sk/obec/markusovce/markusovce.html

Villages and municipalities in Spišská Nová Ves District